Death March is a 2013 Philippine war drama directed by Adolfo Alix, Jr. It was screened in the Un Certain Regard section at the 2013 Cannes Film Festival.

Cast
 Jason Abalos as Carlito
 Sid Lucero as Miguel
 Zanjoe Marudo as Alex
 Sam Milby as Roy Cook
 Felix Roco as Fidel
 Carlo Aquino as Claudio
 Jacky Woo as Hatori
 Luis Alandy
 Benjamin Alves

References

External links
 

2013 films
2013 drama films
Philippine drama films
2010s Tagalog-language films
Philippine black-and-white films
Films directed by Adolfo Alix Jr.